The 2012 LSU Tigers baseball team represents Louisiana State University in the NCAA Division I baseball season of 2012. The Tigers played their home games in the new Alex Box Stadium, which opened in 2009.

The team was coached by Paul Mainieri who was in his sixth season at LSU. The Tigers' season ended at the hands of Stony Brook after a shocking upset in the Baton Rouge Super Regional.

Pre-season

Key Losses

Key Players Returning

Personnel

Roster

2012 LSU Tigers Baseball Roster & Bios http://www.lsusports.net/SportSelect.dbml?SPSID=27867&SPID=2173&Q_SEASON=2011

Coaching Staff
 
2011 LSU Tigers Baseball Coaches & Bios http://www.lsusports.net/SportSelect.dbml?SPSID=28707&SPID=2173&Q_SEASON=2011

Schedule/Results

*Rankings are based on the team's current ranking in the Baseball America poll the week LSU faced each opponent.

Ranking movements

LSU Tigers in the 2012 Major League Baseball Draft
The following members and future members (denoted by *) of the LSU Tigers baseball program were drafted in the 2012 MLB Draft.

References

LSU Tigers baseball seasons
Lsu Tigers Baseball Team, 2012
Southeastern Conference baseball champion seasons
LSU
LSU